John P. Thomas (1886–1944) was an American architect in practice in Portland, Maine.

Life and career
John Pickering Thomas Jr. was born March 30, 1886, in Portland to John Pickering Thomas and Susan Clifford (Ross) Thomas. He was a grandson of William W. Thomas, one-time Mayor of Portland, and nephew of William W. Thomas Jr., the diplomat. He was educated at Milton Academy and graduated from Harvard University in 1909, followed by postgraduate work in the Harvard School of Architecture and travel in Italy. After his return to Boston Thomas worked for C. Howard Walker and William Welles Bosworth before joining the office of Wait & Copeland in 1913, Boston architects with Portland connections. Their works included a house for Thomas' cousin, William W. Thomas, on the Western Promenade. He resigned in 1917 to serve in World War I, spending his time in the Naval Reserve.

In 1919 Thomas returned to Portland permanently, forming a partnership with architect Charles O. Poor, successor to the practice of Frederick A. Tompson. In 1922 Poor died in a railroad accident, and Thomas continued the business alone. In 1923 he incorporated the firm under his own name, in association with Murray Crosman Binford and Albert Cyprian Hobbs. Thomas continued in independent practice for almost 20 years, closing his office in late 1941 upon the United States' entry into World War II. During the war Thomas, still in the Naval Reserve, was attached to the local Naval Intelligence office.

Thomas joined the American Institute of Architects in 1921.

Personal life
Thomas was married in 1913 to Alice Kimber McCandless of St. Louis. They had three children, including two daughters and one son. Thomas died August 9, 1944, at his summer home in Harpswell, Maine.

Legacy
During his lifetime, John P. Thomas was known as a talented designer of buildings in revival styles. His works in the Colonial Revival and Gothic Revival styles in particular were intended to invoke the English heritage of both Thomas and Portland. Four of Thomas' works have been listed on the United States National Register of Historic Places, and others contribute to listed historic districts.

The noted Maine architects Royal Boston Jr. and Josiah T. Tubby both worked for Thomas as drafters and designers.

Architectural works
 Walter G. Davis house, 155 Western Promenade, Portland, Maine (1920)
 James C. Hamlen Jr. house, 149 Western Promenade, Portland, Maine (1920)
 Deering High School, 370 Stevens Ave, Portland, Maine (1922–23)
 Spaulding Memorial Library, 282 Sebago Rd, Sebago, Maine (1923)
 Chestnut Street Methodist Church Community House, 17 Chestnut St, Portland, Maine (1924, NRHP 1977)
 Louis R. Porteous house, 28 Chadwick St, Portland, Maine (1924)
 The Pilgrim, 30 West St, Portland, Maine (1925)
 YMCA Building, 70 Forest Ave, Portland, Maine (1925–27)
 Ricker Park apartments, 290 Baxter Blvd, Portland, Maine (1926–27)
 Sprucewold Lodge, 4–9 Nahanada Rd, Boothbay Harbor, Maine (1926 and 1927, NRHP 2014)
 Walter G. Davis house, 402 Pulpit Rock Rd, Cape Elizabeth, Maine (1927–28)
 Guy P. Gannett house, 880 Shore Rd, Cape Elizabeth, Maine (1927)
 James C. Hamlen house, 15 Chadwick St, Portland, Maine (1927)
 Zeta Psi fraternity house, 14 College St, Brunswick, Maine (1927–28)
 Bonney Memorial Library, 36 Main St, Cornish, Maine (1928)
 Canal Bank Building, 188 Middle St, Portland, Maine (1929–30)
 Gardiner Public Library R. P. Hazzard wing, 152 Water St, Gardiner, Maine (1929–30)
 YWCA Building (former), 41 2nd St, Bangor, Maine (1929–30)
 Gov. Samuel Cony House alterations, 71 Stone St, Augusta, Maine (1930, NRHP 1985)
 Plummer-Motz School, 192 Middle Rd, Falmouth, Maine (1931, NRHP 2016)
 United States Post Office, 28 School St, Sanford, Maine (1932, NRHP 1986)
 Quoddy Village, Eastport, Maine (1935–36)
 Maine Publicity Bureau Building, 501 Danforth St, Portland, Maine (1936, NRHP 1990)
 Stevens Avenue Armory (former), 772 Stevens Ave, Portland, Maine (1940)

See also
 John Pickering Thomas architectural drawings collection, Maine Historical Society

Notes

References

Architects from Portland, Maine
20th-century American architects
1886 births
1944 deaths
Harvard Graduate School of Design alumni